Silver Sands is a summer village in Alberta, Canada. The summer village is located on the shores of Isle Lake. Silver Sands was founded on January 1, 1969.

Demographics 

The Summer Village of Silver Sands' 2012 municipal census counted a population of 154.

Attractions 
The main attraction of this summer village is the Silver Sands golf and country club. Some other attractions are a playground and a horseshoe pit.

Village Council 
Silver Sands currently has a 3-member council whose terms last until 2025. The Members of the council include Graeme Horn (Councillor), Joseph Bernard Poulin (Mayor), and Elizabeth Joan Turnbull (Deputy Mayor).

2021 Election 
On June 12, 2021, the Silver Sand General Election concluded. There were three vacancies in the council, councillor, mayor and deputy mayor. In this election only three candidates ran, therefore under section 34 of the Local Authorities Election Act governing municipal elections in the province of Alberta. By acclamation the three candidates won.

See also 
List of communities in Alberta
List of summer villages in Alberta
List of resort villages in Saskatchewan

References

External links 

1969 establishments in Alberta
Lac Ste. Anne County
Summer villages in Alberta